Luz i Vogël is a village and an administrative unit situated in the central plains of Albania's Western Lowlands region. A former rural municipality, it is now part of Tirana County. At the 2015 local government reform it became a subdivision of the municipality Kavajë. The population at the 2011 census was 4,735.

See also
Luzi United

References

Administrative units of Kavajë
Former municipalities in Tirana County
Villages in Tirana County